PP-7 Rawalpindi-I is a Constituency of Provincial Assembly of Punjab.

Area
 Kahuta Tehsil
 Kallar Syedan Tehsil Municipal Committee Kallar Syedan
 Choha Khalsa Circle Union Councils of Kallar Syedan Tehsil
 Exclude UC33 Bishandote and Arazi Khas of Kallar Syedan Tehsil Page 2

1985-1988:PP-7 (Rawalpindi-VII)
General elections were held on March 12, 1985.(PP-7 – Rawalpindi) Chaudhary Muhammad Khalid won this seat
|-

1988-1990:PP-7 (Rawalpindi-VII)

General elections were held on November 30, 1988 (PP-7 – Rawalpindi) Chaudhary Muhammad Khalid won this seat

1990-1993:PP-7 (Rawalpindi-VII)

General elections were held on November 5, 1990 (PP-7 – Rawalpindi) Shaukat Mahmood Bhatti won this seat

1993-1997:PP-7 (Rawalpindi-VII)

General elections were held on November 30, 1993 (PP-7 – Rawalpindi) Chaudhary Muhammad Khalid won this seat

1997-2002:PP-7 (Rawalpindi-VII)

General elections were held on February 18, 1997 (PP-7 – Rawalpindi) Shaukat Mahmood Bhatti won this seat

2002-2008:PP-7 (Rawalpindi-VII)
General elections were held on November 25, 2002. Musharraf held the presidency from 2001 until 2008,

2008—2013: PP-2 (Rawalpindi-II)
General elections were held on 18 February 2008. Lt. Col (R) Muhammad Shabbir Awan won this seat with 32,816 votes.

All candidates receiving over 1,000 votes are listed here.

2013—2018:PP-2 (Rawalpindi-II)
General elections were held on 11 May 2013. Raja Muhammad Ali won this seat with 43,335 votes.

All candidates receiving over 1,000 votes are listed here.

2018—2022: PP-7 (Rawalpindi-II)

General elections were scheduled to be held on 25 July 2018. In 2018 Pakistani general election, Raja Sagheer Ahmad a Independent politician won PP-7 Rawalpindi II election by taking 44,363 votes.

2022-2023: PP-7 (Rawalpindi-II)
PML-N's Ahmed won the seat with 68,906 votes, however, PTI’s Awan managed to 68,857 votes.

See also
 PP-6 Murree
 PP-8 Rawalpindi-II

References

External links
 Election commission Pakistan's official website
 Awazoday.com check result
 Official Website of Government of Punjab

R